The headland of Cape St. Mary's is located at the southern tip of the south-western arm of the Avalon Peninsula of the island of Newfoundland in the Canadian province of Newfoundland and Labrador.

Cape St. Mary's is probably one of the most well known capes of the province, it has been written in song and history. 
There is a well known folk song about the Cape called "Let Me Fish Off Cape St. Mary's" by Otto P. Kelland.

The Cape St. Mary's Ecological Reserve is a wildlife reserve located east of the Cape. The Friends of Cape St. Mary's is a non-profit organisation of persons who are engaged in sharing the colourful and diverse elements of the ecological reserve.

See also
List of lighthouses in Canada

References

External links
 Aids to Navigation Canadian Coast Guard
 Let Me Fish Off Cape St. Mary's (lyrics)

St. Mary
Lighthouses in Newfoundland and Labrador